The Enmyvaam (also spelled Enmywaam or Emmyvaam in English) is a river located in the Chukotka Autonomous Okrug in the Russian Far East, about  southeast of Chaunskaya Bay. It is fed by and is the main and only outflow of Lake Elgygytgyn, draining into the Belaya, which drains into the Anadyr and eventually the Bering Sea. 

The river flows in the southern direction. It is located within the Anadyr river basin in the Anadyr—Kolyma watershed district.

The name "Enmyvaam" comes from the Chukchi language and means "a river with rocky shores".

References 

Rivers of Chukotka Autonomous Okrug